WorkSafe is an agency within the Department of Mines, Industry Regulation and Safety, which is part of the Government of Western Australia, and responsible for the administration of the Occupational Safety and Health Act of 1984.  
There are also agencies in other states of Australia, and at a national level with similar names and objectives.

The principal objective of the act and the division is to secure the safety and health of people in the workplace.

References

Government agencies of Western Australia
Safety organizations
Occupational safety and health organizations
Medical and health organisations based in Australia
Workplace health and safety in Australia